Asanthus thyrsiflorus is a Mexican species of plants in the family Asteraceae. It is native to the states of San Luis Potosí, Chihuahua, Zacatecas, Aguascalientes, Jalisco, Coahuila, and Durango in north-central Mexico.
	
Asanthus thyrsiflorus is a branching shrub up to 100 cm (40 inches) tall. Flower heads have whitish disc florets but no ray florets. It grows in flats, creekbanks, and gravelly areas, often in pine-oak woodlands.

References

Eupatorieae
Plants described in 1879
Flora of Mexico